Trigonholaspis is a genus of mites in the family Macrochelidae. There are at least four described species in Trigonholaspis.

Species
These four species belong to the genus Trigonholaspis:
 Trigonholaspis amaltheae Vitzthum, 1930
 Trigonholaspis columbiana Vitzthum, 1930
 Trigonholaspis salti Vitzthum, 1930
 Trigonholaspis trigonarum Vitzthum, 1930

References

Macrochelidae
Articles created by Qbugbot